{{safesubst:#invoke:RfD||2=Mark and Avoid|month = February
|day = 28
|year = 2023
|time = 22:01
|timestamp = 20230228220148

|content=
REDIRECT The Way International#Mark and avoid
Shunning

}}